Kentucky Breakdown is an album by Owensboro, Kentucky-based cowpunk band Nine Pound Hammer, released in 2004. It marks the first new material from the band since the album Hayseed Timebomb was released ten years earlier.

Critical reception
Punknews.org wrote that "each song is only a few chords with doubled guitar powerchords with occasional Skynard-esque riffs and solos fronted by Blaine Cartwright of Nashville Pussy fame." Ox-Fanzine wrote that "the album is great, better than any goddamn Nashville Pussy LP, and ties in seamlessly with a classic like Hayseed Timebomb."

Track listing
Intro – 0:50
Rub Yer Daddy's Lucky Belly – 2:19
He Done Run Outta Worms – 2:02
Dead Dog Highway – 2:23
Go-3-Go – 2:20
Drunk, Tired & Mean – 3:19
Double Super Buzz – 2:11
Ain't Hurtin' Nobody – 2:42
Don't Remember Lovin' You Last Night – 2:11
Zebra Lounge – 2:27
800 Miles – 1:55
If You Want to Get to Heaven – 2:34
Chicken Hi, Chicken Lo – 2:51
Goddamn Right – 2:39

Personnel
The following people worked on this album
David Barrick – Producer, Engineer
Matt Bartholomy – Bass
Blaine Cartwright – Guitar, Vocals, 
Mark Chalecki – Mastering
Scott Luallen – Vocals 
Brian Pulito - Drums
Brad Scott – Guitars on "Zebra Lounge"

References

2004 albums
Nine Pound Hammer albums